Francisco Alberto Caamaño is a Santo Domingo Metro station on Line 1. It was open on 22 January 2009 as part of the inaugural section of Line 1 between Mamá Tingó and Centro de los Héroes. The station is between Amín Abel and Centro de los Héroes.

This is an underground station, built below Avenida Dr. Bernardo Correa y Cidrón. It is named to honor Francisco Caamaño.

References

Santo Domingo Metro stations
2009 establishments in the Dominican Republic
Railway stations opened in 2009